Radnor Walk is a residential street in the Royal Borough of Kensington & Chelsea off the King's Road in London. The houses are mid and late Victorian and the street is part of the Royal Hospital Conservation Area. It was originally called Radnor Street, and was named after John Robartes, 1st Earl of Radnor who died in Chelsea in 1685. It was renamed Radnor Walk in 1937.

It runs parallel to Shawfield Street and Smith Street.

Buildings and residents
The street includes a Grade II listed former Welsh Congregational church.

The well known local restaurant Zianni is situated at number 45, while at the top of the street is the Founder's Hall of the notable Hill House School. Famous residents include John Betjeman.

Photographer and film director Terence Donovan and designer Maurice Jeffery opened a boutique, The Shop, at 47 Radnor Walk in the 1960s.

Radnor Studios, dating from mid to late 19th century, were artists' studios. Together with two late Georgian terrace houses, numbers 3 and 5, they were replaced in 1970 with a four-storey block designed by the architects Hayes Stafford.

Occupants of the Studios included:

 James Wedgwood; –
 William Leslie Bowles, Australian sculptor; 1920–1923
 Hibbert Charles Binney; –1897
 Herbert Harry Cawood; –
 Cecil Hew Brown; 
 John Francis Kavanagh, Irish sculptor and artist; –
 Francis Derwent Wood, British sculptor; 1894
 Lady Henrietta Spencer-Churchill, English interior decorator; 1999

References

Streets in the Royal Borough of Kensington and Chelsea